The FBI Academy is the Federal Bureau of Investigation's law enforcement training and research center near the town of Quantico in Stafford County, Virginia. The academy was opened for the purpose of training the new agents after FBI Agents were granted the power to arrest, and to possess a firearm, in 1933. As the newly armed agents needed somewhere to train, the Marine Corps granted them access to their firing ranges in Quantico, Virginia. After outgrowing the Marine Corps firing ranges the FBI was granted permission to build their own firing range and classroom on the base. Over time they added new sections such as a whole new wing, kitchen, and basement. But with the rapid growth it still wasn't enough for their needs. 

In 1965, the FBI received approval for a new complex at Quantico and construction began in 1969. The  new facility opened in 1972, with more than two dozen classrooms, eight conference rooms, a large auditorium, a gym, pool, library, and a new firing range. The new complex had everything the FBI needed to train new agents in large numbers.

In addition to training new FBI agents at the facility, the Training Division also instructs special agents, intelligence analysts, law enforcement officers, Drug Enforcement Administration agents, and foreign partners. The academy provides several training programs, including Firearms, Hogan's Alley (a training complex simulating a small town), Tactical and Emergency Vehicle Operations Center (TEVOC), Survival Skills, and Law Enforcement Executive Development. To meet the needs of these training programs the FBI has a 1.1 mile long oval road track with a precision obstacle for conducting TEVOC. Hogan's Alley is a town that the FBI had built with the help of Hollywood set designers in order to give realistic training to agents. It helps the agents experience realistic and stressful scenarios to better prepare them for real-life situations.

The academy occupies 547 acres (221 ha) on the US Marine Corps Base Quantico. It is located 36 miles outside Washington D.C. and is a full service national training facility.
In order to be able to attend the academy and become an FBI Agent, a candidate must be aged between 23 and 37, a citizen of the United States, and possess a minimum of a bachelor's degree.

Training facilities 
Elite units such as the Hostage Rescue Team (HRT), Evidence Response Teams (ERT), Special Weapons and Tactics (SWAT), and about 1,000 police leaders from across the world attend the FBI Academy and utilize its training facilities to improve on skills. A newer feature to the academy's facilities is newly renovated  aquatic training center with a high tech filtration system and digital communications between water/chemical balance, that are 90% more effective.

Aquatic classes are used to boost cardio-respiratory endurance, muscular strength, flexibility, power and speed. While new agent trainees utilize the facility to receive CPR and lifesaving skills, larger units such as HRT officers receive over 450 hours of training that include advanced scuba diving, nighttime diving, rescue diving, and rescue swimming in the facilities. The FBI and DEA trainees also have classes that are focused on physical conditioning, basic water survival skills, and team work.

See also
 CIA University
 RCMP Academy, Canada
 FSB Academy, Russia
 Criminal Minds, TV series
 The Silence of the Lambs, Film
 Quantico, TV series
 Mindhunter, TV series

References

External links
 New Agent Training
 The FBI Academy  Documentary produced by WETA-TV

Federal Bureau of Investigation
Federal police academies in the United States
Government agencies established in 1972
Shooting ranges in the United States
1972 establishments in Virginia
Buildings and structures in Prince William County, Virginia
Quantico, Virginia